Amoria damonii, common name Damon's volute, is a species of sea snail, a marine gastropod mollusk in the family Volutidae, the volutes. It forms a complex of attractive, large shells which has been studied extensively by Abbottsmith.

It was named in honor of English conchologist Robert Damon (1814–1889).

Taxonomy
According to Bail et al. (2001) the following taxa can be differentiated:

 Amoria (Amoria) damonii damonii Gray 1864
 = reticulata (Reeve, 1844)
 = hedleyi (Iredale, 1914)
 Amoria (Amoria) damonii forma keatsiana Ludbrook, 1953
 = gatliffi (Sowerby III, 1910)
 Amoria (Amoria) damonii reevei (Sowerby II, 1864)
 Amoria (Amoria) damonii ludbrookae Bail & Limpus, 1997

Description

Amoria damonii has a large size that varies between 75 and 140 mm. The protoconch is glossy, domed, white on the early whorls, tawny later. The spire is conical with a deep-set suture.

Distribution
The Amoria damonii complex includes four large, evidently correlated populations of Amoria, whose distribution extends from Cape Leeuwin (S.W. Australia) to the northern east coast of Queensland, i.e. for more than 6,500 km of coastline. Such a large range, rare in Volutidae, is even more unusual for an Amoria. This long stretch of coastline implies genetic differentiation and favours polytypism, giving rise to many taxonomic problems.

Habitat
These marine gastropod molluscs occur in tropical zones on continental shelf, intertidal and subtidal waters, at depths of 0 to 90 m.

Bibliography
 A. G. Hinton - Guide to Australian Shells
 Alan G. Hinton - Shells of New Guinea & Central Pacific
 Bail P. & Poppe G. T. 2001. A conchological iconography: a taxonomic introduction of the recent Volutidae. ConchBooks, Hackenheim.
 Bail, P., Limpus, A. & Poppe, G. T. (2001): "The Genus Amoria". In: Poppe, G. T. & Groh, K.: A Conchological Iconography. 50 pp., 93 plts. ConchBooks, Hackenheim, .
 Harald Douté, M. A. Fontana Angioy - Volutes, The Doute collection
 Wilson, B. (1993). Australian Marine Shells Part 2

References

External links
 Encyclopedia of life
 Animalbase

Volutidae
Gastropods described in 1864
Taxa named by John Edward Gray